Craig Jay (born Craig Adam Jay) is a former tight end in the National Football League. He played for the Green Bay Packers during the 1987 NFL season.

References

Players of American football from Miami
Green Bay Packers players
American football tight ends
1963 births
Living people
Mount Senario College alumni